Robert Beacham (or Beauchamp) was a founding settler of Norwalk, Connecticut.

He originally settled at Ipswitch, Massachusetts Bay Colony in 1648. His land in Norwalk was immediately south of the present day site of the East Norwalk Historical Cemetery, and the bridge leading south from that area was formerly called Beacham's Bridge. Due to his location being in between the main area of the settlement and the area then called The Neck where cattle grazed, he served as a "gate-keeper." He left Norwalk in 1657 or 1658, and settled near Green's Farms in present-day Westport. He was made a freeman of Fairfield in 1664.

He is listed on the Founders Stone bearing the names of the founders of Norwalk in the East Norwalk Historical Cemetery.

References

1600s births
1600s deaths
American Puritans
English emigrants to British North America
Founding settlers of Norwalk, Connecticut
First settlers of New England